Cristian Alexandru Daminuță (born 15 February 1990) is a Romanian professional footballer who plays as a centre back or defensive midfielder.

Club career

Politehnica Timișoara
Daminuță made his debut for Politehnica Timișoara in the 2005–06 Divizia A season, against Dinamo București.

Internazionale Milano
In 2008, he was signed by Internazionale, spending the 2008–09 season with the Internazionale's youth team.

Modena loan
On 15 July 2009, both Modena and Internazionale confirmed that Daminuță would spend the 2009–10 season on loan at Modena. He made his Serie B debut on 11 September 2009 against Lecce, when he came on the pitch at the 89th minute.

Dinamo București loan
At the start of 2010, he was loaned at Dinamo București.

Milan & L'Aquila loan
On 16 July 2010, Daminuță signed with A.C. Milan. only to be sent on loan to L'Aquila a month later.

Virtus Cupello
Daminuță joined Italian club ASD Virtus Cupello on 21 August 2019. He only appeared in one match, getting also on the scoresheet, before returning to Romania.

ACS Poli Timișoara
One month later, ACS Poli Timișoara announced that he had signed with the club.

References

External links
 Cristian Alexandru Daminuta at Assocalciatori.it 
 
 

1990 births
Living people
Sportspeople from Timișoara
Romanian footballers
Romania youth international footballers
Association football midfielders
Association football defenders
FC CFR Timișoara players
FC Politehnica Timișoara players
Inter Milan players
Modena F.C. players
FC Dinamo București players
A.C. Milan players
L'Aquila Calcio 1927 players
FC Tiraspol players
FC Viitorul Constanța players
CS Minaur Baia Mare (football) players
Hapoel Nir Ramat HaSharon F.C. players
FC Olimpia Satu Mare players
ACS Poli Timișoara players
Liga I players
Liga II players
Serie B players
Liga Leumit players
Liga III players
Romanian expatriate footballers
Expatriate footballers in Moldova
Romanian expatriate sportspeople in Moldova
Expatriate footballers in Italy
Romanian expatriate sportspeople in Italy
Expatriate footballers in Israel
Romanian expatriate sportspeople in Israel